Syed Aijazuddin Shah (Popular Meeruthi) (Urdu: پاپولرمیرٹھی) is an Urdu and Hindi humorist, satirist and poet. He has been performing Mushaira and Kavi Sammelan for the last 45 years all over the world. Popular Meeruthi was awarded Kaka Hatrasi Award  for his humorous poetry by HRD Minister Shri Ramesh Pokhriyal

Early life 
He was born on 9 August 1953 in Meerut to Syed Nizamuddin Shah and Syeda Akhtari Begum. He went to Faiz-E-Am Inter College in Meerut. While doing his graduation, he was the President of the Students’ Association. He completed his graduation and post-graduation from Meerut College. He was awarded a PhD in Urdu literature from Chaudhary Charan Singh University in 2009 for Mazhayia Shayri, Nafsiyati Mutalia.

Career 
He began his career teaching Urdu literature in the Urdu department of Meerut College. After becoming popular with Mushaira, he gave up teaching to pursue it. He recited poems in 'Tamseli Mushaires' organized in Faiz-e-Am inter college. He attended his first international Mushaira in Saudi Arabia in 1989.

Performance 
Meeruthi is among very few senior shayars of India. While traveling around the world, he has made promoted Indian culture and the Hindi and Urdu languages abroad. Popular Meeruthi was invited as a guest in The Kapil Sharma Show on the 23 January 2022 episode of Season 3 along with Shailesh Lodha and Sanjay Jhala.  Popular Meeruthi was also invited in Wah! Wah! Kya Baat Hai! on Sony SAB TV He has travelled all over the world to attend Mushairas and Kavi Sammelan.

List of publications 

Popular Meeruthi has published books in Urdu, Hindi

 Haas Kar Guzar Dai, 1993
 Nawai e Rafta, 2002
 Double Role, 2005
 Popular Kalam, 2009
 Zikar Fiqar Aur Fun, 2016
 Munshi Sher Kha Boom Meeruthi, 2018
 Ghalib Aur Main, 2022

References 



Living people
1956 births
Urdu-language poets from India
Poets from Uttar Pradesh
People from Meerut district
20th-century Indian poets
20th-century Indian male writers
Indian male poets